Zarzecze  is a village in the administrative district of Gmina Puławy, within Puławy County, Lublin Voivodeship, in eastern Poland.

History
In 1827, Zarzecze had a population of 89.

Following the joint German-Soviet invasion of Poland, which started World War II in September 1939, the village was occupied by Germany. The Germans operated a subcamp of the Stalag 307 prisoner-of-war camp in the village, which housed some 3,000-4,000 POWs.

References

Villages in Puławy County